James Kelly (11 November 1931 – 10 August 2003) was an English footballer who played as a defender.

Career
Born in Linton, Morpeth, Northumberland, Kelly started his career at Watford, who then played in Division Three South. He signed for Blackpool on 15 October 1954 for £15,000 and the promise of playing Watford in a friendly with the Seasiders, who were then playing in the First Division, the top flight in England. Kelly recalled of the events: "On the Friday I signed for Blackpool, within 24 hours I had travelled from London to Bramall Lane and was playing against Sheffield United. We got beaten 2–1 – and we desperately needed the points too – but meeting my new colleagues in the dressing room and having my first experience of Blackpool's polished style of play helped to make it an otherwise unforgettable day." He scored his first goal for the club later that season, on 26 February 1955 in a 3–1 defeat to West Lancashire rivals Preston North End. The following summer he toured with a Football Association XI, playing against Bermuda on 12 May 1955.

In October 1955 he had a transfer request turned down, and another request in January 1956 was also turned down. In 1958 he won another representative honour when he played for the FA XI against the Army. In the 1959–60 season he became Blackpool's club captain. He then gained his coaching certificate at Lilleshall. In May 1961, after 244 league and cup games for Blackpool, Kelly emigrated to Australia, where he joined South Coast United in New South Wales. He was voted Player of the Year by three newspapers in Sydney at the end of 1961: the Sydney Morning Herald, the Illawarra Mercury and the Sydney Daily Telegraph.

He then became player-coach of South Coast United and went on to coach the Australian national team, as well as the New South Wales Federation. In the 1964–65 season he won the Sydney First Grade League competition with South Coast United. He was offered a new contract but chose instead to go back to England in 1965. He returned to the Fylde coast playing non-League football in the Lancashire Combination with Fleetwood in the 1966–67 season. In the summer of 1968 he returned to Australia for a second spell.

After football
In 1965 Kelly established an insurance broker company, Jim Kelly & Co. Ltd, in Blackpool. The company still bears his name. Kelly died on 10 August 2003, aged 71.

References

Further reading

1931 births
2003 deaths
Blackpool F.C. players
Watford F.C. players
English Football League players
English footballers
People from Morpeth, Northumberland
Footballers from Northumberland
South Coast United players
Fleetwood Town F.C. players
Association football defenders